This is a list of aircraft in alphabetical order beginning with 'W'.

W

W1
 W1 Drevak

WAACO
(West Australian Aircraft Company – WAACO)
 WAACO Staggerbipe Mk.1

Wabash 
(Wabash Aircraft Co, Terre Haute Indiana)
 Wabash WA-250X

WAC 
(Wilmington Aero Club, Wilmington Delaware)
 WAC Delaplane

Wackett 
(Lawrence J. Wackett)
 Wackett Warbler
 Wackett Gannet
 Wackett Warrigal
 Wackett Widgeon I
 Wackett Widgeon II

Waco 
(1920 Weaver Aircraft Co 1923: Advance Aircraft Co. 1928: Waco Aircraft Co.)

Early Waco types
 Waco 1 Baby Flying Boat
 Waco 1 Cootie
 Waco 2 Cootie Biplane
 Waco 3
 Waco 4
 Waco 4-1/2
 Waco 5
 Waco 6
 Waco 7
 Waco 8
 Waco 9
 Waco International

Waco O series (Variants of Waco 10 – open cockpit biplanes 1927-9)
 Waco 10 series
 Waco 90
 Waco 125
 Waco 220-T
 Waco 225-TW
 Waco 240-A
 Waco BS-165
 Waco CS-225
 Waco GXE
 Siemens-Waco
SO series (Straightwing)
 Waco ASO
 Waco BSO
 Waco CSO-A
 Waco CSO
 Waco DSO
 Waco HSO
 Waco KSO
 Waco OSO
 Waco PSO
 Waco QSO
 Waco RSO
TO series (Taperwing)
 Waco ATO
 Waco CTO-A
 Waco CTO
 Waco HTO
 Waco JTO
 Waco JYO 

Waco A series (2-seat side-by-side biplanes 1932–1933)
BA series
 Waco BBA
Waco IBA
Waco KBA
Waco PBA
Waco TBA
Waco UBA
CA series
Waco ICA
Waco KCA
Waco PCA
Waco TCA
Waco UCA
LA series
Waco PLA Sportsman
Waco ULA Sportsman

Waco Standard Cabin series biplanes (1932–1938)
DC series
 Waco BDC
 Waco ODC
 Waco PDC
 Waco QDC
 Waco UDC
EC series
 Waco BEC
 Waco OEC
 Waco UEC
IC series
 Waco UIC
JC series
 Waco CJC
 Waco DJC
KC series
 Waco UKC
 Waco YKC
KC-S series
 Waco UKC-S
 Waco YKC-S
 Waco ZKC-S
JC-S series
 Waco CJC-S
 Waco DJC-S
KS series
 Waco DKS-6
 Waco HKS-7
 Waco UKS
 Waco VKS-7
 Waco YKS
 Waco ZKS

Waco Custom Cabin Series sesquiplanes (1935–1938)
GC series
 Waco AGC-8
 Waco DGC-7 Custom Cabin
 Waco EGC-7 Custom Cabin
 Waco EGC-8
 Waco MGC-8
 Waco UGC-7
 Waco VGC-7
 Waco YGC
 Waco ZGC
QC series
 Waco AQC-6
 Waco CQC-6
 Waco DQC-6
 Waco EQC-6
 Waco SQC-6
 Waco UQC-6
 Waco VQC-6
 Waco YQC-6
 Waco ZQC-6
UC series
 Waco CUC
OC series
 Waco UOC
 Waco YOC

Waco D series (Military biplanes 1934–37)
 Waco CHD
 Waco JHD-6
 Waco S2HD Super Sport
 Waco S3HD-A
 Waco S3HD
 Waco WHD

Waco E series Executive "Aristocrat" cabin biplanes (1939)
 Waco ARE
 Waco HRE
 Waco SRE
 Waco WRE

Waco F series tandem 2/3-seat open cockpit biplanes (1930–1937)
BF series
 Waco OBF
 Waco PBF
 Waco TBF
 Waco UBF
CF series
 Waco PCF
 Waco QCF
 Waco UCF
MF series
 Waco UMF-3
 Waco UMF-5
 Waco YMF-3
 Waco YMF-5
NF series
 Waco ENF Special
 Waco INF
 Waco KNF
 Waco MNF
 Waco QNF
 Waco RNF
PF series
 Waco CPF
 Waco DPF
 Waco EPF
 Waco HPF-7
 Waco LPF-7
 Waco UPF
 Waco VPF
 Waco YPF
 Waco ZPF

Waco M series (Mailplanes based on Waco 10)
 Waco JWM
 Waco JYM

Waco N series tricycle/nosewheel gear cabin biplanes (1937–1938)
 Waco AVN-8
 Waco ZVN-7
 Waco ZVN-8

Military Aircraft
 Waco C-62 (Cancelled Transport)
 Waco C-72 (designation for all Wacos impressed into USAAC/USAAF)
 Waco CG-4 (troop glider)
 Waco CG-15 (troop glider)
 Waco PG-3 (powered glider)
 Waco XJW (US Navy designation for UBF used for trapeze experiments on flying aircraft carriers)
 Waco J2W (USCG designation for EGC-7)
 Waco PT-14 (USAAC designation for primary trainer based on UPF-7)

Misc Waco Types
 Waco Aristocraft pusher cabin monoplane
 Waco CRG (1930 National Air Tour Special, two CRGs only)
 Waco FBH (ad hoc aircraft built by Waco employees)
 Waco LAJ (powered glider)
 Waco NAZ (Primary glider)
Waco SFB
 Waco RPT (low-wing monoplane military trainer)
WACO Sirrus
VELA S220

Waco 
(Waco Aircraft Co Inc (founders: Rich & Linda Melhoff), Forks Washington)
 Waco Super Taperwing

Wacyk-Tyrala
(Stanisław Wacyk and Tadeuz Tyrala)
 Wacyk-Tyrala WT-1

Wadsworth 
(Patrick Wadsworth)
 Wadsworth PW-01

WAG-Aero 
(WAG-Aero Inc., Lyons Wisconsin)
 WAG-Aero CUBy
Wag-Aero CHUBy CUBy
Wag-Aero Sportsman 2+2
 WAG-Aero WAG-A-Bond

Wagner
( Dr. Gerhard Wagner)
 Wagner DOWA 81

Wagner 
(Harold A Wagner, 4539 NE 21 St, Portland Oregon)
 Wagner Parasol
 Wagner Twin 1
 Wagner Twin 2
 Wagner Twin 3

Wagner 
(Helikopter Technik Munchen – Wagner)
 Wagner Sky-trac
 Wagner Aerocar

Wagner 
((Fred G) Wagner Aircraft Co Inc, San Diego California)
 Wagner W-18 Flight article on W-18 here:

Wagner 
(Marney Wagner)
 Wagner V-Witt

Wainfan 
(Barnaby Wainfan, Long Beach California)
 Wainfan Facetmobile FMX-4
 Wainfan Facetmobile FMX-5

Wainscott 
(Lee Wainscott, Compton California)
 Wainscott 1950 Biplane

Waitamo Aircraft 
(Waitamo Aircraft pty. Ltd.)
 Waitamo PL-11 Airtruck

Walco 
(Weckler-Armstrong-Lillie Co, 2717 Irving Park Blvd, Chicago Illinois)
 WALCO biplane flying boat
 Walco Tandem Monoplane Air Boat

Walden 
( Dr Henry W Walden, Mineola NY. )
 Walden I
 Walden II
 Walden III
 Walden IV
 Walden V
 Walden VI
 Walden VII
 Walden VIII
 Walden IX
 Walden X
 Walden XI
 Walden XII

Walden 
((Henry?) Walden-(Roscoe) Markey Inc, Strickland & Bassett Aves, Mill Basin New York)
 Walden-Markey WM-1

Waldroop 
(Arthur L Waldroop, Palmyra NB.)
 Waldroop A-1

Walker
(Sam Walker)
 Walker Aria

Walker-Greve 
(Fred & Herman Greve, Detroit MI)
 Walker-Greve Wild Goose

Walkerjet
(Třemošná, Czech Republic)
Walkerjet Schoolboy
 Walkerjet Simon
 Walkerjet Simon +
 Walkerjet Simon Compact
 Walkerjet Simon Tandem
 Walkerjet Spider
 Walkerjet Super Hawk
 Walkerjet XC 100 evo
 Walkerjet XC 200 evo

Wallace 
( (Stanley) Wallace Aircraft Co, 4710 Irving Park Blvd, Chicago IL)
 Wallace C-2
 Wallace Touroplane B
 Wallace C-31
 Wallace Trainer

Wallace Brothers 
(Frank C and Fred M Wallace, Bettendorf Iowa)
 Wallace Brothers Blackhawk

Wallis 
 Wallis Venom
 Wallis WA-116 Agile
 Wallis WA-117
 Wallis WA-118 Meteorite
 Wallis WA-119
 Wallis WA-120
 Wallis WA-121
 Wallis WA-122

Wallis 
(Stanley B Wallis, Ypsilanti Michigan)
 Wallis 1981 Biplane

Wallman 
(Fred W Wallman Jr, Minneapolis Minnesota)
 Wallman Sportplane

Walraven 
(L.W. Walraven, Bandoeng, Java)
 Walraven 2
 Walraven 4

Walsh 
(San Diego Aeroplane Mfg Co (fdr: Charles Francis Walsh), San Diego California)
 Walsh 1910 Monoplane
 Walsh 1910 Biplane
 Walsh 1911 Biplane

Walsh Brothers
(Walsh Brothers, New Zealand)
 Walsh Brothers Manurewa No 1
 Walsh Brothers Type D

Walter 
(Dale "Red" Walter & Roy Campbell, Severy Kansas)
 Walter Dale RD-9

WAR 
(War Aircraft Replicas, Brandon, Florida)
W.A.R. Focke-Wulf 190
W.A.R. F4U Corsair
W.A.R. P-47 Thunderbolt
W.A.R. Hawker Sea Fury
W.A.R. P-51 Mustang
W.A.R. P40E
W.A.R. Japanese Zero
W.A.R. P-38 Lightning
W.A.R. Bf109
W.A.R. TA-152H: "long nose Focke Wulf"
W.A.R. Macchi C.200 Saetta
W.A.R. Grumman F8F Bearcat
W.A.R. Hawker Tempest II
W.A.R. Hawk 75A-3
W.A.R. Fokker D.XXI
W.A.R. F6F-3 Hellcat
W.A.R. Lavochkin La. 5FN
W.A.R. Junkers Ju. 87B-2 Stuka "Inline Czech Walter Minor engine specified".
W.A.R. P-26 Peashooter
W.A.R. Spitfire

Warbird 
Data from:
 Warbird 80% Scale Bearcat
 Warbird 75% Scale P47
 Warbird 84% Scale Zero
 Warbird 78% Scale Dauntless
 Warbird Scale Stuka
 Warbird Scale FW190
 Warbird Scale AT6

Warchalowski 
 Warchalowski Biplane

Warner 
(Arthur P Warner, Beloit Wisconsin)
 Warner-Curtiss 1909 Biplane

Warner Aerocraft 
(Warner Aerocraft Company, Seminole, Florida, United States)
 Warner Revolution I
 Warner Revolution II
 Warner Spacewalker I
 Warner Spacewalker II
 Warner Sportster

Warner-Young 
 Warner-Young Skycar

Warren 
(W H "Glen" Warren, San Luis Obispo California)
 Warren CP-1
 Warren CP-2
 Warren Taperwing

Warren & Young 
Warren & Young 1937 aeroplane

Warrior 
(Warrior Aeronautical Corp, Alliance OH)
 Warrior C

Warwick 
(William Warwick, Torrance CA)
 Warwick M-1 Tiny Champ
 Warwick W-3 Bantam
 Warwick W-4 Hot Canary

Washington 
(Washington Aeroplane Co, College Park Maryland)
 Washington Miss Columbia

Washington Aeroprogress
(Seattle, Washington)
Washington T-411 Wolverine

Washington Navy Yard 
 Washington Navy Yard Seaplane (akaRichardson 82-A)

Wasp 
(Wasp Airplane Co, 3440 Boston Ave and 1044 51 Ave, Oakland California)
 Wasp Special
 Wasp T-2 Air Coupe
 Wasp T-2 Air Coach

Waspair 
 Waspair HM 81 Tomcat
 Waspair Tomcat Standard
 Waspair Tomcat Sport
 Waspair Tomcat Tourer

Wasp Systems
(Later Wasp Flight Systems, Crook, Cumbria, United Kingdom)
Wasp SP Mk2
Wasp SP Mk4

Wassmer 
 Wassmer WA-20 Javelot: First flight August 1956. Later referred to as the Javelot I.
 Wassmer WA-21 Javelot II: First flight 25 March 1958.
 Wassmer WA-22 Super Javelot: First flight 26 June 1961. Modified forward fuselage and swept fin.
 Wassmer WA-22 Super Javelot 64: 1964 model, with increased outer wing dihedral.
 Wassmer WA-22-28
 Wassmer WA-23
 Wassmer WA-26 Squale
 Wassmer WA-26 CM Squale Marfa
 Wassmer WA-28 Espadon
 Wassmer WA-30 Bijave
 Wassmer WA-40 Super IV Sancy
 Wassmer WA-41 Baladou
 Wassmer WA-50
 Wassmer WA-51 Pacific
 Wassmer WA-52 Europa
 Wassmer WA-54 Atlantic
 Wassmer WA-70
 Wassmer WA-80 Piranha
 Wassmer D.120 Paris-Nice

Watanabe 
(KK Watanabe Tekkosho - Watanabe Iron Works Ltd.) (from 1943 - Kyushu Aeroplane Company Ltd. q.v.)
 Watanabe E9W
 Watanabe E14W
 Watanabe K6W
 Watanabe K8W
 Watanabe Q1W Tokai
 Watanabe Q3W1 Nankai (South Sea)
 Watanabe Navy Experimental 9-Shi Small Reconnaissance Seaplane
 Watanabe Navy Experimental 11-Shi Intermediate Seaplane Trainer
 Watanabe Navy Experimental 12-Shi Small Reconnaissance Seaplane
 Watanabe Navy Experimental 12-Shi Primary Seaplane Trainer
 Watanabe Navy Type 96 Small Reconnaissance Seaplane
 Watanabe Navy Type 2 Primary Trainer Momiji
 Watanabe Navy Type 2 Intermediate Trainer
 Watanabe Navy Type 2 Fighter Trainer
 Watanabe Navy Type 3-2 Land-based Primary Trainer
 Watanabe Siam Navy Reconnaissance Seaplane (K6W)
 Watanabe MXY-1
 Watanabe MXY-2

Water-based Aircraft Design & Research Institute 
 Sea Gull-100(A1)
 Sea Gull-200

Waterhouse 
( (William J) Waterhouse & (Lloyd) Royer Aircraft, Glendale California)
 Waterhouse BC-1 Tijuana
 Waterhouse BC-2 Tijuana
 Waterhouse BC-3 Tijuana
 Waterhouse Roamair
 Waterhouse Cruizair

Waterman 
(Waterman Aircraft Mfg Co, 3rd & Sunset, Venice CA.{Waldo Dean Waterman})
 Waterman 1910 Biplane
 Waterman 1911 Biplane
 Waterman 3L-400
 Waterman W-1
 Waterman W-1 Special
 Waterman W-4 Arrowplane
 Waterman W-5 Arrowbile
 Waterman-Boeing C
 Waterman Gosling
 Waterman Flying Wing
 Waterman Flex-Wing (a.k.a. CLM Special and Variable Wing Monoplane)
 Waterman Pusher
 Waterman Chevy Bird
 Waterman Arrowplane
 Waterman Arrowbile
 Waterman Aerobile
 Waterman Whatsit
 Waterman CLM Special (a.k.a. Flex-Wing and Variable Wing Monoplane)
 Waterman Variable Wing Monoplane (a.k.a. CLM Special and Flex-Wing)

Watkins 
(Watkins Aircraft Co (pres: Everett Watkins), Wichita Kansas)
 Watkins SL-1
 Watkins SL-2 Skylark (a.k.a. X-470E)

Watkinson 
(Taylor Watkinson Aircraft Company, UK)
Watkinson Dingbat, also known as Taylor-Watkinson Dingbat

Watson 
(Watson Windwagon Company / Gary Watson, Newcastle Texas)
 Watson GW-1 Windwagon

WDFL 
(WD Flugzeug Leichtbau / Wolfgang Dallach)
 Dallach D.2 Sunrise
 Dallach D.4 Fascination
 Dallach Sunrise IIA
 Dallach Sunrise IIB
 Dallach Sunrise IIC
 Dallach Sunrise (Verner)
 WDFL Sunwheel

Weatherley 
((John C) Weatherly Aviation Co Inc, Hollister, California, United States)
 Weatherly WM-62C
 Weatherly 201
 Weatherly 210
 Weatherly 620

Weatherly-Campbell 
(Ray Weatherly & Bill Campbell, Dallas Texas)
 Weatherly Colt

Weaver-Wellet 
(Goodwin K Weaver & Oliver Wellet, a.k.a. Weaver Air Service, 353 S Audubon Rd, Indianapolis Indiana)
 Weaver-Wellet WAS-5
 Weaver-Wellet WW-1

Webber 
(Marshal D Webber, Jefferson Ohio)
 Webber BFW-1

Weber 
(Ernst Weber)
 Weber EW 18

Weber 
(Wilibald Weber)
 Weber Perereca

Wedell-Williams 
( (James R) Wedell-(Harry P) Williams Air Service Corp, Patterson Louisiana)

 Wedell-Williams We-Will (1929)
 Wedell-Williams We-Winc (1930)
 Wedell-Williams We-Will Jr. (1932)
 Wedell-Williams McRobertson racer
 Wedell-Williams Model 22
 Wedell-Williams Model 44
 Wedell-Williams Model 44 Special
 Wedell-Williams Model 45
 Wedell-Williams XP-34

Weeks 
(Kermit Weeks, Miami Florida)
 Weeks Special
 Weeks Solution

Weeks-Riggs 
(Elling O Weeks and E A "Gus" Riggs, Terre Haute Indiana)
 Weeks-Riggs 1910 aeroplane
 Weeks-Riggs 1911 aeroplane

Wega
(Wega Industria Aeronautica Palhoça, Santa Catarina, Brazil)
Wega 180

Weick 
(Fred E Weick, 130 Cherokee Rd, Hampton Virginia)
 Weick W-1
 Weick Ag-1
 Weick Ag-2
 Weick Ag-3

Weidmann 
((George) Weidmann Body & Trailer Co, North Tonawanda New York)
 Weidmann Flying Tank

Weil 
(Lehman Weil, 225 West 71 St, New York New York)
 Weil 1927 Ornithopter

Weinberg 
(William Weinberg)
 Weinberg S.E.5a Replica

Weir 
(G & J Weir Ltd.)
 Weir W.1
 Weir W.2
 Weir W.3
 Weir W.4
 Weir W.5
 Weir W.6
 Weir W.7
 Weir W.8
 Weir W.9
 Weir W.10
 Weir W.11 Air Horse
 Weir W.13
 Weir W.14 Skeeter

Weiss
see:Manfred Weiss

Welch 
((Orin) Welch Aircraft Co, Anderson IN. / Welch Aviation Co.)
 Welch 1927 Biplane
 Welch OW-1
 Welch OW-2
 Welch OW-3 (a.k.a. Hi-Lift)
 Welch OW-4
 Welch OW-5M
 Welch ACE Falcon
 Welch OW-6M
 Welch OW-6S
 Welch OW-7M
 Welch OW-8M
 Welch OW-9M
 Welch OW-10
 Welch OW-X
 Welch Parasol
 Welch-Standard J-1

Weller Flugzeugbau 
(Bibersfeld, Germany)
Weller ULI NG
Weller UW-9 Sprint
Weller Vickers Blériot

Weller-Lusk 
(R C Lusk & R M Weller, Burbank California)
 Weller-Lusk Model 1

Wellington 
(Harry Wellington, Ontario California)
 Wellington Sport Mk 1 Pup

Wells 
(Harry Wells, Cicero Illinois)
 Wells 1915 Biplane"Reo"

Wells 
(Eugene W Wells, Hawaii)
 Wells Shama WWI

Welsh 
(George T Welsh, Long Beach California)
 Welsh Rabbit A
 Welsh Rabbit B

Welsher 
(Burdette Star Welsher, 519 High St, San Luis Obispo California)
 Welsher Arrowplane

Weltensegler
 Weltensegler light biplane

Wendt 
((Robert) Wendt Aircraft Corp, 825 Main St, N Tonawanda New York)
 Wendt W-1-400 Falconer
 Wendt W-2 Swift

Wendt 
((Harold O) Wendt Aircraft Engr, La Mesa California)
 Wendt WH-1 Traveler

Werkheiser & Matson 
(C M Matson & Harlan Werkheiser, Bloomsburg Pennsylvania)
 Werkheiser & Matson Model A (a.k.a. Experimental)

Werkspoor 
(Werkspoor NV)
 Werkspoor Jumbo

Wesley 
(Joseph K Wesley, Somerset Kentucky)
 Wesley Special

Weserflug 
(Weser Flugzeugbau)
 Weserflug Bf 163
 Weserflug WFG 270
 Weserflug We 271

West 
(Russell West, Atlanta (GA?) Packard Co.)
 West Special
 West Southern Air Boss

West Coast 
(West Coast Air Service Inc, Portland Oregon)
 West Coast 1928 Monoplane

Westbrook 
(Westbrook Aeronautical Corp (founders: John Knox McAfee, Neil Westbrook Perdew), Teterboro, NJ)
 Westbrook W-5
 Westbrook W-5-B Sportster

Westermayer
(Oskar Westermayer)
 Westermayer WE 01
 Westermayer WE 03
 Westermayer WE 04
 Westermayer B8M

Western 
(Western Aircraft Supplies, Calgary Alberta Canada)
 Western PGK-1 Hirondelle

Western 
(Western Airplane & Supply Co, Burbank California)
 Western Sport

Western 
(Western Airplane Co, 53 W Jackson Blvd, Chicago Illinois)
 Western Airplane King Bird

Western 
(Western Aircraft Corp (pres: Georges Hamilton), San Antonio Texas)
 Western Westair 204

Western Aircraft 
(Western Aircraft Corp, 521 Cooper Bldg, Denver Colorado)
 Western Aircraft Sport

Western Aircraft Supplies 
(Western Aircraft Supplies)
 Western Aircraft Supplies Monsoon
 Western PGK-1 Hirondelle

Westfall 
( Westfall Aircraft Co.)
 Westfall Sport

Westfield 
(Miles Westfall, Oklahoma City OK and New Richmond Indiana)
 Westfall W-7 Special
 Westfall W-7 Sport

Westfield 
(Westfield Aircraft Co (Summit Aeronautical Corp), Westfield Massachusetts)
 Westfield Trainer

Westland 
 Westland Belvedere
 Westland C.29
 Westland C.O.W. Gun Fighter
 Westland CL.20 1930s autogyro
 Westland Dragonfly
 Westland Dreadnought
 Westland F.29/27
 Westland F.7/30
 Westland Gazelle
 Westland Gannet
 Westland Interceptor
 Westland Limousine
 Westland Lynx
 Westland Lysander
 Westland Merlin
 Westland N.1B
 Westland N.16
 Westland N.17
 Westland-Hill Pterodactyl
 Westland PV-3 (Houston-Westland)
 Westland P.V.6
 Westland P.V.7
 Westland Scout
 Westland Sea King
 Westland Sea King AEW.2
 Westland Sea King AEW.5
 Westland Sea King ASaC7
 Westland Sioux
 Westland Super Lynx
 Westland Wagtail
 Westland Wallace
 Westland Walrus
 Westland Wapiti
 Westland Wasp
 Westland Weasel
 Westland Welkin
 Westland Wessex
 Westland Wessex (fixed wing).
 Westland Westbury
 Westland Westminster
 Westland Whirlwind (fixed wing)
 Westland Whirlwind (helicopter)
 Westland Widgeon (fixed wing)
 Westland Widgeon (helicopter)
 Westland Witch
 Westland Wizard
 Westland Wyvern
 Westland Yeovil
 Westland WG.33

Weyger
(Alexander Weyger)
 Alexander Weyger Discopter

Weymann 
(Charles Terres Weymann / Société des Avions C.T.Weymann / Lepère)
 Weymann W-1
 Weymann CTW-66
 Weymann CTW-100
 Weymann CTW-130
 Weymann CTW-131
 Weymann CTW-200
 Weymann CTW-201
 Weymann CTW-210
 Weymann CTW-231
 Weymann-Lepère WEL-10
 Weymann-Lepère WEL-50
 Weymann-Lepère WEL-52
 Weymann-Lepère WEL-63 tri-motor airliner
 Weymann-Lepère WEL-80
 Weymann-Lepère Aeromobile

Weyrauch
(Ronaldo Weyrauch)
 Weyrauch MZ-1 (Mehrzweck Zweimot No.1 or multirole twin no.1)

Wezel 
(Martin Wezel Flugzeugtechnik)
 Wezel TL Sting
 Wezel TL 3000 Sirius
 Wezel Apis 2

W_F_W
 see:- Thunderbird

Whatley 
(Vascoe Whatley)
 Whatley Special

WHE 
(W.H. Ekin)
 WHE Airbuggy

Wheelair 
(Puget-Pacific Airplane Co; Tacoma Washington)
 Wheelair-IIIA

Wheeler 
(Ken Wheeler / Wheeler Technology)
 Wheeler Express

Wheeler
(Ron Wheeler Aircraft (Slaes) Pty. Ltd.)
 Wheeler Scout Mk.III

Wheeling 
(Wheeling Aircraft Co, Pontiac Michigan)
 Wheeling PJ-1

Whigham 
(Eugene Whigham)
 Whigham GW-1
 Whigham GW-2
 Whigham GW-3
 Whigham GW-4
 Whigham GW-5
 Whigham GW-7

Whisper Aircraft
(Mossel Bay, South Africa)
Whisper Aircraft Whisper
Whisper X350 Generation II

Whitcraft 
(Whitcraft Corp, Eastford Connecticut)
 Whitcraft 165

White 
(George D White, 117 E 49 St, Los Angeles California)
 White Baby White
 White Sport Monoplane
 White Trans-Pacific Flyer

White 
(George White, St Augustine Florida)
 White 1928 Ornithopter

White 
((Donald G) White Aircraft Co, Woodward Airport, Leroy New York)
 White A-R
 White D-25B
 White Gull
 White Pirate
 White PT-2
 White PT-7
 White Tiger

White 
(William T White, Dallas Texas)
 White Longhorn

White 
(E Marshall White, Huntington Beach California)
 White WW-1 Der Jäger D.IX

White 
(Van White, Lubbock Texas)
 White Whirlwind

White & Thompson 
 White & Thompson No.1 Seaplane
 White & Thompson No.2 Flying Boat
 White & Thompson No.3
 White & Thompson NT.3 Bognor Bloater

White's 
( (Burdette S & Harold L) White's Aircraft, Ames Iowa)
 White's Hummingbird
 White's A
 White's B
 White's Sport C-1
 White's Sport C-2
 White's Sport C-3
 White's Sport S-30
 Burdette S-30
 Whitey Sport A

White-Kremsreiter 
((Benjamin) White-(Hans) Kremsreiter, Milwaukee Wisconsin)
 White-Kremsreiter W-K Special

Whitehead 
(Whitehead Aircraft Company)
 Whitehead Comet

Whitehead 
(Gustave Whitehead (Gustav Weisskopf), Bridgeport Connecticut)
 Whitehead Number 21 (1901)
 Whitehead 1911 Helicopter

Whiteman 
(Lawrence Henry Whiteman, Wichita Kansas)
 Whiteman Junior

Whitman 
(Earl E Whitman, Point Richmond California)
 Whitman Amphibian

Whitney 
(Dean-Wilson Aviation Ltd / C.W. "Bill" Whitney)
 Whitney Boomerang

Whittaker 
(Michael Whittaker, Clayton, Yorkshire, United Kingdom)
Whittaker MW2 Excalibur
Whittaker MW4
Whittaker MW5 Sorcerer
Whittaker MW6S Fatboy
Whittaker MW6T Merlin
Whittaker MW7
Whittaker MW8

Whittelsey 
(Whittelsey Mfg Co, 220 Howard St, Bridgeport Connecticut)
 Whittelsey Amphib
 Whittelsey Avian

Whittemore-Hamm 
((Harris) Whittemore-(?) Hamm Co, Saugus Massachusetts)
 Whittemore-Hamm L-2
 Whittemore-Hamm L-3

Whittenbeck 
(Clem Whittenbeck, Greenwood Missouri, Lincoln Nebraska and Miami Oklahoma)
 Whittenbeck Mono-special

Whittenburg 
(Mickey Whittenburg, Connecticut)
 Whittenburg 1965 Monoplane

Wibault 
(Société des Avions Michel Wibault)
 Wibault 1
 Wibault 2
 Wibault 3
 Wibault 7
 Wibault 72
 Wibault 73
 Wibault 74
 Wibault 8 Simoun
 Wibault 9
 Wibault 10 twin boom project
 Wibault 10/II re-allocated for two-seat parasol-wing recce aircraft, built for A.2 1923 competition
 Wibault 12 Sirocco
 Wibault 100 Four engine transport (prototype only) 
 Wibault 121 Sirocco
 Wibault 122
 Wibault 123
 Wibault 124
 Wibault 125
 Wibault 13 Trombe I   single-seat lightweight fighter to C.1 1926 Jockey fighter contest
 Wibault 130 Trombe I
 Wibault 170 Tornade
 Wibault 210
 Wibault 220
 Wibault 240
 Wibault 260
 Wibault 270 1928 C.1 spec.
 Wibault 280T
 Wibault 281T
 Wibault 282T
 Wibault 283T
 Wibault 313
 Wibault 360T5
 Wibault 361
 Wibault 362
 Wibault 363
 Wibault 364
 Wibault 365
 Wibault 366
 Wibault 367
 Wibault 368

Wibault significant projects 
Wib.4 heavy bomber project?
Wib.5 single-seat parasol-wing fighter project, submitted to C.1 1923
Wib.6 two-seat parasol-wing fighter derivative of Wib.5
Wib.11 single-seat fighter project powered by one 500 hp engine, for C.1 1923
Wib.14 two-seat parasol-wing tourist aircraft project
Wib.14H a floatplane version of Wib.14
Wib.15 single-seat fighter project to C.1 1926 contest
Wib.160 Trombe II a more powerful version of Wib.130 Trombe I, also for C.1 1926
Wib.170 single-seat lightweight fighter for C.1 1926
Wib.230 three-engined transport aircraft project?
Wib.270 single-seat lightweight fighter project for C.1 1928
Wib.330 transport aircraft (no more details)
Wib.340 two-seat low-wing tourist aircraft project

Wichita 
(Wichita Aeroplane Service Co)
 Wichita 1919 Monoplane

Wichita 
(Wichita Airplane Mfg Co (C A Noll, Anson O Rorabaugh), 716 (?>912) W 1st St, Wichita Kansas)
 Wichita Cadet
 Wichita Cadet Captain
 Wichita Cadet Major

Wickham 
(James Wickham, Seattle Washington)
 Wickham Model A Bluebird
 Wickham Model B
 Wickham Model C Sunbird
 Wickham Model E Sunbird II
 Wickham Model F

Wickner
(Geoffrey N. Wikner)
 Wicko Cabin Sports
 Wicko Wizard

Widerøe 
(Widerøes Flyveselskap)
 Widerøe Polar

Wieber 
(John C Wieber, Milwaukee Wisconsin)
 Wieber 1934 Biplane

Wielemans
 Wielemans S.W.1
 Wielemans SW.2

Wienberg
(William Weinberg, Kansas City, Missouri, United States)
Weinberg S.E.5a Replica

Wier
(Ronald Wier, San Diego, California, United States)
 Wier RDW-2 Draggin' Fly

Wigal 
(Fritz Wigal, Jackson Tennessee)
 Wigal 1964 Autogyro

Wight
(Confusion may reign here:-
Owner:J. Samuel White,
Designer Howard T. Wright,
Company Name Wight Aircraft Co.)
 Wight Twin Landplane
 Wight Twin Seaplane
 Wight Seaplane (Admiralty Type 840)
 Wight Seaplane No.1
 Wight Seaplane No.2
 Wight Converted Seaplane
 Wight Baby
 Wight Pusher Seaplane
 Wight Navyplane
 Wight Improved Navyplane Type A.I
 Wight Improved Navyplane Type A.II
 Wight Quadruplane
 Wight Trainer Seaplane
 Wight Bomber
 Wight Triplane Flying Boat

Willard 
(Also check McCurdy-Willard Planes)
 Willard Channel Wing
 Willard Breathless
 Willard Gasser
 Willard Schoolboy
 Willard Church Mid-Wing Model JC-2

Wilbur 
(Joe W Wilbur, Exeter New Hampshire)
 Wilbur 1931 Monoplane

Wilcox 
 Wilcox White Ghost

Wilcox 
(H F Wilcox Aeronautics Inc, Verdigris Oklahoma)
 Wilcox T-12-1 Sport Trainer

Wiley 
(Oklahoma City OK)
 Wiley 1934 Monoplane

Wild 
(Alec Wild)S
 Wild DoubleEnder

Wild
(Robert Wild / Comte)
 Wild DT
 Wild 43
 Wild X biplane

Wilde 
(Lehman Wilde, NY)
 Wilde Ornithicopter

Wilder 
(Charles A Wilder, Bronson Michigan)
 Wilder Model A

Wilden 
(Helmut Wilden)
 Wilden VoWi-8

Wildfire Air Racing 
 Wildfire Air Racing Wildfire

Wiley Post 
(Wiley Post Aircraft Corp, Oklahoma City OK)
 Wiley Post Model A

Wilford 
(E Burke Wilford, Paoli PA)
 Wilford Executive Transport
 Wilford WRK Gyroplane

Willard 
(Charles F Willard, Hempstead NY and Los Angeles California)
 Willard 1910 Biplane

Williams 
(J Newton Williams, Ansonia Connecticut)
 Williams 1907 Helicopter
 Williams 1908 Helicopter

C W Williams 
(C W Williams)
 Williams 1908 Parafoil

O E Williams 
(O E Williams Aeroplane Co (founders: Osbert Edwin & Inez Williams), Scranton Pennsylvania)
 Williams 1911 Biplane
 Williams 1912 Biplane
 Williams 1913 Biplane
 Williams 1914 Hydro Aeroplane
 Williams 1917
 Williams Model 5

Williams 
(Beryl J Williams Co, Venice & Pasadena California)
 Williams 1911 Biplane

Williams 
(Szekely Aircraft & Engine Co, Holland Michigan)
 Williams Monoplane

Williams 
(Art Williams and Guy Gully, Alliance Ohio)
 Williams Special
 Williams W-17 Stinger
 Williams WC-1 Sundancer
 Williams-Gully Special

Williams 
(Paul Williams, Dayton Ohio)
 Williams 750-PW

Williams 
(Walt Williams, Perris California)
 Williams W

Williams 
(Robert F Williams, Houston Texas)
 Williams Skeeter Hawk

Williams 
(Floyd Williams, Eagle Grove Iowa)
 Williams 1970 Biplane

Williams 
(Bob Williams)
 Williams W-2

Williams International 
((Sam B) Williams Intl, Walled Lake Michigan)
 Williams V-Jet II

Williams Texas-Temple 
(Texas Aero Mfg Co (fdr: George W Williams), Temple TX. )
 Williams Texas-Temple 1908 Monoplane
 Williams Texas-Temple 1926 Monoplane
 Williams Texas-Temple C-4
 Williams Texas-Temple Commercial-Wing
 Williams Texas-Temple Speed-Wing
 Williams Texas-Temple Sport
 Williams Texas-Temple Trimotor
 Williams Texas-Temple Sportsman

Williamson 
(Roger Williamson, San Antonio Texas)
 Williamson Roadrunner

Willoughby 
(Capt Hugh L. Willoughby, Newport Rhode Island)
Willoughby Gray Goose II
Willoughby Pelican
Willoughby War-Hawk
Willoughby Biplane

Willoughby 
(Willoughby Delta Company)
Willoughby Delta 8

Wills Wing
(Santa Ana, California, United States and later Orange, California)
Wills Wing Alpha
Wills Wing Attack Duck
Wills Wing Condor
Wills Wing Duck
Wills Wing Eagle
Wills Wing Falcon
Wills Wing Fusion
Wills Wing Harrier
Wills Wing HP
Wills Wing HP AT
Wills Wing Omega
Wills Wing Omni
Wills Wing RamAir
Wills Wing Raven
Wills Wing Skyhawk
Wills Wing Spectrum
Wills Wing Sport
Wills Wing Sport American
Wills Wing Sport AT
Wills Wing SST
Wills Wing Super Sport
Wills Wing T2
Wills Wing Talon
Wills Wing U2
Wills Wing Ultra Sport
Wills Wing XC

Wilson 
 Avid Flyer
 Wilson Global Explorer
 Wilson Private Explorer

Wilson 
(John H Wilson, Middlesex Pennsylvania)
 Wilson 1909 Biplane

Wilson 
(Al & Herbert Wilson, Ocean Park California)
 Wilson 1913 Biplane
 Wilson 1917 Monoplane

Wilson 
(Wilson & Co, 529 W Douglas, Wichita Kansas)
 Wilson Cadet

Wilson 
((Dr Frank M) Wilson Aircraft Company, Los Angeles California)
 Wilson Mid-Wing 3-B

Wilson 
(James Wilson, Los Angeles California)
 Wilson Baby Cyclone
 Wilson Li'l Rebel
 Wilson Sky Mouse

Windecker 
(Windecker Industries Inc.)
 Windecker Eagle
 Windecker YE-5

Winds Italia
(Bologna, Italy)
Winds Italia Airwalker
Winds Italia Orbiter
Winds Italia Raven

Windstar 
(Windstar, Boise Idaho)
 Windstar YF-80

Windspire
(Windspire Inc.)
 Windspire Aeros

Windtech Parapentes
(Gijón, Spain)
Windtech Altair
Windtech Ambar
Windtech Arial
Windtech Bali
Windtech Bantoo
Windtech Cargo
Windtech Combat
Windtech Coral
Windtech Evo
Windtech Fenix
Windtech Honey
Windtech Impulse
Windtech Kali
Windtech Kinetik
Windtech Loop
Windtech Nitro
Windtech Pulsar
Windtech Quarx
Windtech Ru-bi
Windtech Serak
Windtech Silex
Windtech Spiro
Windtech Syncro
Windtech Tactic
Windtech Tecno
Windtech Tempest
Windtech Tempus
Windtech Tonic
Windtech Tuareg
Windtech Tucan
Windtech Windy
Windtech Zenith
Windtech Zephyr

Windward Performance 
 Windward Performance Perlan II
 Windward Performance SparrowHawk
 Windward Performance DuckHawk

Wing 
((George S) Wing Aircraft Co/Hi-Shear Corp, 2660 Skypark Dr, Torrance California)
 Wing D-1 Derringer
 Wing D-2M Derringer COIN

Wingco 
 Wingco Atlantica

Wingler 
(Wingler Aeronautical Co, Riverside Iowa)
 Wingler S-2
Founded by Frank Joseph Wingler

Wings of Change
(Fulpmes, Austria)
Skyman Amicus
Skyman The Rock
Skyman CrossCountry
Skyman Heartbeat
Skyman CrossAlps
Skyman PassengAir
Skyman Tandem
Skyman Reinhold II
Skyman Furio
Wings of Change Acrominator
Wings of Change Braveheart
Wings of Change Chinhook Bi
Wings of Change Crossblade
Wings of Change Deathblade
Wings of Change Druid
Wings of Change Edonis
Wings of Change Reinhold
Wings of Change Ötzi
Wings of Change Predator
Wings of Change Psychohammer
Wings of Change Speedy Gonzales
Wings of Change Taifun
Wings of Change Tsunami
Wings of Change Tuareg
Wings of Change Twister
Wings of Change X-Fighter
Wings of Change XPlor-air

Wings Of Freedom 
(Wings Of Freedom LLC, Hubbard, Ohio, United States)
Wings of Freedom Flitplane
Wings of Freedom Phoenix 103

Wingler 
 Wingler S-2

Winicki 
 Winicki helicopter

Winner
(Winner SCS)
 Winner B150

Winslow 
(Capt Stewart V Winslow, Lewistown Montana)
 Winslow 1904 Monoplane

Winstead 
( (Carl & Guy) Winstead Brothers Airplane Co, Wichita Kansas)
 Winstead Special

Winton
(Scott Winton)
 Winton Sapphire 10
 Winton Sapphire LSA

Wipaire
(Wipaire Inc.)
 Wipaire Super Beaver
 Wipaire Boss Turbo-Beaver

Wise
(Ralph Wise, United States)
Wise GT-400

Wiseman 
(Fred Wiseman & M W Peters, San Francisco and Petaluma California)
 Wiseman 1910 Biplane
 Noonan-Wiseman 1911 Biplane

Wisenant 
(Oscar H Wisenant, Colorado Springs Colorado)
 Wisenant 1920 Monoplane

Wissler 
((Clarence H) Wissler Airplane Co, Bellefontaine Ohio)
 Wissler WA-6
 Wissler WA-9

Wittemann-Lewis 
(Wittemann-Lewis Aircraft Co Inc.)
 Wittemann 1907 Biplane
 Wittemann 1907 Triplane
 Wittemann 1911 Biplane
 Wittemann-Lewis 1923 Biplane
 Wittemann-Lewis Barling NBL-1
 Wittemann-Lewis T-T

Wittman 
(Steve J. Wittman)
 Wittman Tailwind
 Wittman Midwing
 Wittman Big X
 Wittman Chief Oshkosh
 Wittman Buster
 Wittman Hardly-Ableson
 Wittman 0&0 Special
 Wittman V-Witt
 Wittman DFA a.k.a. Little Bonzo
 Wittman D-12 Bonzo
 Wittman W-5 Buttercup
 Wittman W-8 Tailwind
 Wittman W-9 Tailwind
 Wittman W-10 Tailwind

Wiweko 
(Wiweko Soepono)
 Wiweko Wel-1

Wixon 
(H H Wixon, Chicago IL)
 Wixon 1907 Monoplane

Witzig-Lioré-Dutilleul 
 Witzig-Lioré-Dutilleul n° 1
 Witzig-Lioré-Dutilleul n° 2

W.K.F. 
(Wiener Karosserie und Flugzeugfabrik)
 W.K.F. 80.01
 W.K.F. 80.02
 W.K.F. 80.03
 W.K.F. 80.04
 W.K.F. 80.05
 W.K.F. 80.06 (D.I)
 W.K.F. 80.06B (D.I)
 W.K.F. 80.07
 W.K.F. 80.08
 W.K.F. 80.09
 W.K.F. 80.10
 W.K.F. 80.12
 W.K.F. series 81 (Knoller C.II(WKF))
 W.K.F. series 82 (Lloyd C.V(WKF))
 W.K.F. series 83 (Aviatik C.I(WKF))
 W.K.F. series 84 (Aviatik D.I(WKF))
 W.K.F. 85 (D.I)
 W.K.F. series 184 (Aviatik D.I(WKF))
 W.K.F. series 284 (Aviatik D.I(WKF))
 W.K.F. series 384 (Aviatik D.I(WKF))
 W.K.F. C.I
 W.K.F. D.I (80.06B)

WLT
(Wolfsberg Letecká Továrna s.r.o. )
 WLT Sparrow

WNF 
(Wiener Neustädter Flugzeugwerke GmbH)
 WNF Wn 11
 WNF Wn 15
 WNF Wn 16 (Salmson)
 WNF Wn 16 (Hirth)
 Doblhoff WNF 342

Wogen 
(Orville Wogen, Lake Mills Iowa)
 Wogen Sport Wing

Wolf 
(Donald S Wolf, Huntington New York)
 Wolf W-11 Boredom Fighter

Wolf
(Steve Wolf)
 Wolf Cyclone

Wolff 
(Albert Wolff, Denver Colorado)
 Wolff S-12

Wolford-Wilson 
(Dale Wolford & Elmer Wilson )
 Wolford-Wilson Sailwing

Wolfsberg
(Wolfsberg Aircraft Corp. NV / Wolfsberg-Evektor / Wolfsberg Letecká Tovarna s.r.o.)
 Wolfsberg 257 Raven (initial design)
 Wolfsberg-Evektor Raven (second company)
 Wolfsberg Corvus 1F (third company)

Wolverine 
(Wolverine Aeronautic Co, Albion Michigan)
 Wolverine 25hp Biplane
 Wolverine 30hp Biplane

Wombat
 Wombat Gyrocopters Wombat

Wood 
(Charles A Wood, Clay Center Kansas)
 Wood CR-1 Little Monster

Wood 
(Dick Wood, Kansas City Missouri)
 Wood Liten Vinge

Wood 
(Callbie Wood, Wilson North Carolina)
 Wood CF-1
 Wood CF-4 Four-Runner

Wood 
(Stanley Wood, Glendale Arizona)
 Wood SL-1

Wood 
(Steven K. Wood)
 Wood Sky Pup

Wood & English 
(Thomas W Wood & Noel L English, Wiggins Mississippi)
 Wood & English 1935 Monoplane

Woodford 
((Edwin S) Woodford Airplanes Inc., Portland Oregon)
 Woodford Special

Woodson 
(Woodson Aircraft Corp, Bryan Ohio)
 Woodson Express 2-A
 Woodson Foto
 Woodson M-6
 Woodson Sport 3-A
 Woodson Transport 4-B

Woodward 
 Woodward Aero Navigator

World 
(World Aircraft Company, Paris, TN)
 World Aircraft Spirit
 World Aircraft Vision
 World Aircraft Freedom
 World Aircraft Surveyor
 World Aircraft Sentinel

World Seair 
(Edgewater, Florida, USA)
World Seair Corp Seair

World War I Aeroplanes
(World War I Aeroplanes, Inc, Poughkeepsie, New York, United States)
World War I Aeroplanes Fokker D.VII

Worldwide Ultralite 
(Worldwide Ultralite Industries)
 Worldwide Ultralite Clipper
 Worldwide Ultralite Skyraider S/S
 Worldwide Ultralite Spitfire

Worsell
(Tom Worsell)
 Worsell Monoplane

Wouters
(Jean de Wouters d'Oplinter)
 Wouters W.4

Wozniak
(Frank B. Wozniak)
 Wozniak Double Eagle

Wren 
 Wren Goldcrest

Wren 
 Wren 460
 Wren 460P
 Wren 460 Beta STOL

Wright 
(Wright Aeronautical)
 Wright Flyer I
 Wright Flyer II
 Wright Flyer III
 Wright Model A
 Wright Military Flyer
 Wright Model A(Transitional Model)
 Wright Aeroboat
 Wright AH
 Wright AO-3 Mohawk (Dayton-Wright XO-3 in use as an engine test-bed a.k.a. Iron Horse)
 Wright Astra
 Wright Model B
 Wright B-1
 Wright B-2
 Wright B-3
 Wright Baby Grand
 Wright Baby Wright
 Wright R Roadster
 Wright BB
 Wright Model C
 Wright CH Hydroaeroplane
 Wright Model D Scout
 Wright Model E
 Wright EX Vin Fiz
 Wright Model F Tin Cow
 Wright Model G Aeroboat
 Wright Model H
 Wright HS
 Wright Model I (a.k.a. Coastal Defence Hydro)
 Wright Model J (a.k.a. Long Bull)
 Wright Model K
 Wright Model L
 Wright Racer
 Wright Model V
 Wright WP
 Wright Model X
 Wright F2W
 Wright F3W Apache
 Wright NW
 Wright SDW

Wright 
((H W) Wright & Co, Wilmar California)
 Wright Light Sport

Wright 
(Dr Thomas Edward A Wright, Wichita Kansas)
 Wright Experimental

Wright 
(A F Wright, Dubuque Iowa)
 Wright 1932 Monoplane

Wright 
(James R Wright, St Clair Shores Michigan)
 Wright 1933 Biplane

Wright-Bellanca 
 Wright-Bellanca WB-1
 Wright-Bellanca WB-2

Wright-Gingerich 
(Harvey C Wright, Iowa City Iowa)
 Wright-Gingerich HS

Wright-Hughes 
((James) Wright Machine Tool Co, Cottage Grove Oregon)
 Wright-Hughes H-1B

Wright-Martin 
 Wright-Martin M-8
 Wright-Martin R
 Wright-Martin Pulitzer Racer
 Wright-Martin V

Wright Redux 
(Wright Redux Assn, Glen Ellyn Illinois)
 Wright Redux Flyer

Wrobel
(Gerard Wrobel, Beynes, Alpes-de-Haute-Provence, France)
Wrobel Vroby 2

Wüst 
(Aschaffenburg, Germany)
Wüst Seahawk

Wyandotte 
(Wyandotte High School, Kansas City Kansas)
 Wyandotte Pup

Wysong 
(Forrest E Wysong, Raleigh North Carolina)
 Wysong 1915 Biplane

References

Further reading

External links

 List of aircraft (W)